43 Stonegate is a historic, Grade II* listed building in the city centre of York, in England.

The building was probably constructed in the 15th century.  It was remodelled in the 17th century, and the front and roof were replaced in the late 18th century.  At the time, it was the White Dog pub, which by the mid-19th century had become the White Hart Inn.  Since 1991, it has housed the Pyramid Gallery.

The building is timber framed and has three storeys and a cellar.  Both of the upper storeys are jettied.  There is a shop window at ground-floor level, while the upper floors have bay windows.  The rear wall is of 18th-century brick.  Inside, there is a historic cooking range in the cellar, in a stone fireplace.  The main staircase is also historic, while on the second floor there is part of a frieze and several 17th-century doors.

References

Stonegate 43
Stonegate (York)
Timber framed buildings in Yorkshire